State Academic Folk Dance Ensemble Faizi Gaskarov is a professional folk dance company of the Republic of Bashkortostan.

Awards 
 Salawat Yulayev Award

References 

Organizations based in Bashkortostan
Music of Bashkortostan
Soviet performing ensembles